Miranda Rachelle Maverick (born July 1, 1997) is an American mixed martial artist who competes in the Flyweight division of the Ultimate Fighting Championship (UFC). She competed in Flyweight division of the Invicta Fighting Championships.

Background 
Maverick was born in Tunas, Missouri. She grew up working on her family farm moving around many states in the Midwest and Southern United States, earning her the strength that she is known for within the martial arts community. She started grappling when she was sixteen after encouragement by her father while watching Ronda Rousey fight on the television. She also joined her high school wrestling team at Buffalo High School in Buffalo, Missouri her senior year and competed on the men's varsity team until discovering that she would not be going to college for wrestling. She then stopped to focus on wrestling, instead turning her sights on MMA soon after she graduated high school.

Despite concentrating in mixed martial arts, Maverick graduated with honors from Drury University, majoring in psychology and sociology in 2018. Maverick then relocated to Norfolk, VA to pursue a PhD in Industrial/Organizational Psychology at Old Dominion University.

Mixed martial arts career

Early career 
Maverick started her amateur career in 2015, fighting under Kansas City Fighting Alliance, ShoFight, and The Blue Corner promotions. She amassed a record of 7–1, winning the Blue Corner and Shofight flyweight championships all while 18 years old, being listed as the number one amateur woman in her region on Tapology at the time she went pro. After her final amateur win, she was soon contacted by President Shannon Knapp of Invicta Fighting Championships.

Invicta Fighting Championships 

Maverick made her promotional debut on November 18, 2016, at Invicta FC 20: Evinger vs. Kunitskaya against Samantha Diaz. Samantha Diaz cut off her hair the day of weight-ins to make weight and Maverick came in over 2 pounds above the strawweight limit. Maverick won the fight via rear naked choke in round one.

Her next pro fight was on March 25, 2017, at Invicta FC 22: Evinger vs. Kunitskaya II facing Kalyn Schwartz.  On the weight-in Maverick missed weight by 4.5 Ibs over the upper limit of 116 Ibs. She won the fight via submission on round one.

On July 15, 2017, Maverick faced Gabby Romero at Invicta FC 24: Dudieva vs. Borella. She won the fight via unanimous decision.

Her next fight came on July 21, 2018, facing Brogan Walker-Sanchez at Invicta FC 30. She won the fight via unanimous decision. she lost the fight via unanimous decision.

Maverick faced Victoria Leonardo on September 1, 2018, at Invicta FC 31: Jandiroba vs. Morandin. She defeated Leonardo via a submission.

At Invicta 34 in February 2019, Maverick lost a unanimous decision to DeAnna Bennett.

In September, Maverick entered the Invicta Phoenix Series flyweight tournament with a chance to reestablish herself in the flyweight division. In the first round of the tournament, consisting of one 5-minute round, she defeated Victoria Leonardo via striking and clinch in a rematch via unanimous decision. Her second round match (also one 5-minute round) ended with Maverick submitting Shanna Young via rear naked choke. Maverick won the tournament by defeating DeAnna Bennett in a rematch by third round neck crank submission in the finals.

Maverick defeated Pearl Gonzalez at Invicta FC 39 on February 7, 2020.

Ultimate Fighting Championship
Maverick was expected to make her promotional debut against Mara Romero Borella on June 27, 2020, at UFC on ESPN: Poirier vs. Hooker. However, Maverick was forced to pull out due to injury.

Maverick faced Liana Jojua on October 24, 2020, at UFC 254. She won the fight via TKO due to a doctor stoppage between rounds one and two.

Maverick was expected to face Gillian Robertson at UFC 258 on February 13, 2021. However, hours before the fight, Robertson had a non-COVID related illness and the bout was cancelled. The pair was eventually rescheduled to UFC 260 on March 27, 2021. Maverick won the fight via unanimous decision.

Maverick faced Maycee Barber on July 24, 2021, at UFC on ESPN: Sandhagen vs. Dillashaw. She lost the fight via controversial split decision. 22 out of 22 media outlets scored the bout as a win for Maverick.

Maverick stepped in for an injured Maycee Barber to face Erin Blanchfield on December 11, 2021, at UFC 269. She lost the fight by unanimous decision.

Replacing Mandy Böhm, Maverick faced Sabina Mazo on March 12, 2022, at UFC Fight Night 203. Maverick won the fight via rear-naked choke in round two.

Maverick was scheduled to face Shanna Young on August 20, 2022, at UFC 278. However, the bout was cancelled when Young was hospitalized due to weight cutting issues. The pair was rescheduled at UFC Fight Night 214. She won the fight via unanimous decision.

Maverick is scheduled to face Jasmine Jasudavicius on June 10, 2023, at UFC 289.

Mixed martial arts record 

|-
|Win
|align=center| 11–4
|Shanna Young
|Decision (unanimous)
|UFC Fight Night: Rodriguez vs. Lemos
|
|align=center|3
|align=center|5:00
|Las Vegas, Nevada, United States
|
|-
|Win
|align=center| 10–4
|Sabina Mazo
|Submission (rear-naked choke)
|UFC Fight Night: Santos vs. Ankalaev
|
|align=center|2
|align=center|2:15
|Las Vegas, Nevada, United States
|
|-
|Loss
|align=center|9–4
|Erin Blanchfield
|Decision (unanimous)
|UFC 269
|
|align=center|3
|align=center|5:00
|Las Vegas, Nevada, United States
|
|-
|Loss
|align=center|9–3
|Maycee Barber
|Decision (split)
|UFC on ESPN: Sandhagen vs. Dillashaw 
|
|align=center|3
|align=center|5:00
|Las Vegas, Nevada, United States
|
|-
| Win
| align=center| 9–2
|Gillian Robertson
|Decision (unanimous)
|UFC 260
|
|align=center|3
|align=center|5:00
|Las Vegas, Nevada, United States
|
|-
| Win
| align=center| 8–2
|Liana Jojua
|TKO (doctor stoppage)
|UFC 254
|
|align=center|1
|align=center|5:00
|Abu Dhabi, United Arab Emirates
|
|-
| Win
| align=center| 7–2
| Pearl Gonzalez
| Decision (unanimous)
| Invicta FC 39: Frey vs. Cummins II
| 
| align=center| 3
| align=center| 5:00
| Kansas City, Kansas, United States
| 
|-
| Win
| align=center| 6–2
| DeAnna Bennett
| Submission (rear-naked choke)
| Invicta FC Phoenix Series 2
| 
| align=center| 3
| align=center| 3:38
| Kansas City, Kansas, United States
|
|-
| Win
| align=center| 5–2
| Heather Walker-Leahy
| Submission (guillotine choke)
| Shogun Fights 22
| 
| align=center| 1
| align=center| 1:38
| Oxon Hill, Maryland, United States
|
|-
| Loss
| align=center| 4–2
| DeAnna Bennett
| Decision (unanimous)
| Invicta FC 34: Porto vs. Gonzalez
| 
| align=center| 3
| align=center| 5:00
| Kansas City, Missouri, United States
|
|-
| Win
| align=center| 4–1
| Victoria Leonardo
| Submission (armbar)
| Invicta FC 31: Jandiroba vs. Morandin
| 
| align=center| 1
| align=center| 3:26
| Kansas City, Missouri, United States
| 
|-
| Loss
| align=center| 3–1
| Brogan Walker-Sanchez
| Decision (unanimous)
| Invicta FC 30: Frey vs. Grusander
| 
| align=center| 3
| align=center| 5:00
| Kansas City, Missouri, United States
|
|-
| Win
| align=center| 3–0
| Gabby Romero
| Decision (unanimous)
| Invicta FC 24: Dudieva vs. Borella
| 
| align=center| 3
| align=center| 5:00
| Kansas City, Missouri, United States
|
|-
| Win
| align=center| 2–0
| Kalyn Schwartz
| Submission (armbar)
| Invicta FC 22: Evinger vs. Kunitskaya II
| 
| align=center| 1
| align=center| 3:01
| Kansas City, Missouri, United States
|
|-
| Win
| align=center| 1–0
| Samantha Diaz
| Submission (rear-naked choke)
| Invicta FC 20: Evinger vs. Kunitskaya
| 
| align=center| 1
| align=center| 4:26
| Kansas City, Missouri, United States
|
|-

| Win
| align=center| 2–0
| Shanna Young
| Submission (rear-naked choke)
| Invicta FC Phoenix Series 2
| 
| align=center| 1
| align=center| 2:35
| Kansas City, Kansas, United States
|Flyweight tournament semifinal exhibition bout.
|-
| Win
| align=center| 1–0
| Victoria Leonardo
| Decision (unanimous)
| Invicta FC Phoenix Series 2
| 
| align=center| 1
| align=center| 5:00
| Kansas City, Kansas, United States
|Flyweight tournament quarterfinal exhibition bout.
|-

See also 
 List of female mixed martial artists
 List of current UFC fighters

References

External links

Living people
1997 births
Sportspeople from Missouri
American female mixed martial artists
American practitioners of Brazilian jiu-jitsu
Female Brazilian jiu-jitsu practitioners
Flyweight mixed martial artists
Mixed martial artists utilizing Brazilian jiu-jitsu
Drury University alumni
Ultimate Fighting Championship female fighters
21st-century American women